Kaisa Ye Pyar Hai
(How Is This Love) is an Indian series that aired on Sony Entertainment Television, produced by Balaji Telefilms, starring Mohammed Iqbal Khan as Angad Khanna and Neha Bamb as Kripa Sharma.The show ended on 5 October 2006.

Plot
Angad Khanna is a popular playboy rockstar who takes life as it is. Kripa is a small town girl from foothill of Himalayas who comes to Mumbai with big dreams in her eyes. Circumstances force these two opposites towards each other and hence starts their passionate, often volatile love story.

Cast

Soundtracks

References

External links
 

Balaji Telefilms television series
Indian romance television series
Sony Entertainment Television original programming
2005 Indian television series debuts
2006 Indian television series endings
Indian musical television series